Brahmachari is a 1992 Indian Tamil-language comedy film directed by Muktha Srinivasan. The film stars Nizhalgal Ravi and Gautami. It was released on 15 January 1992.

Plot

Ganesan (Nizhalgal Ravi) is a bachelor and wants to get married as soon as possible. Ganesan and his friend Panchavarnam (Charle) look for the perfect bride. Later, Ganesan falls in love with Malathi (Gautami) at the first sight. He follows her everywhere and even proposes his wish to marry her. At first, Malathi refuses but she then accepts his love. Malathi is from a rich family and her father Periya Thiruvadi (Vennira Aadai Moorthy) only wants a rich groom, while Ganesan is a poor guy. There comes Ganesan's uncle (Janagaraj) from Dubai and the lovers think that he is rich. Knowing the news, Thiruvadi is urged to prepare their wedding. His uncle turns out to be a simple hairdresser in Dubai. Ganesan, Malathi and his uncle decide to maintain the lie until the end of the wedding. What transpires later forms the crux of the story.

Cast

 Nizhalgal Ravi as Ganesan
 Gautami as Malathi
 Janagaraj as Ganesan's uncle
 Vennira Aadai Moorthy as Periya Thiruvadi, Malathi's father
 S. S. Chandran
 Charle as Panchavarnam
 Jai Ganesh as Thangaraj
 Manorama as  Malathi's grandmother
 Sulakshana as Kokila
 Sangeetha
 Kumarimuthu as Muthu
 Kokila as Mary
 V. Gopalakrishnan as Gopal
 Oru Viral Krishna Rao
 Pasi Sathya
 Sivaraman
 Karuppu Subbiah

Soundtrack

The film score and the soundtrack were composed by Deva. The soundtrack, released in 1992, features 5 tracks with lyrics written by Vaali and Vairamuthu.

References

1992 films
Indian comedy films
Films scored by Deva (composer)
1990s Tamil-language films
Films directed by Muktha Srinivasan